Barrack Street Jetty is located on the edge of Perth Water on the Swan River in Perth, Western Australia. It is no longer used on the Transperth ferry service between the Perth central business district and South Perth, having been replaced on that service with Elizabeth Quay Jetty.

Historically, it has been a significant location on Perth Waterfront at the end of Barrack Street. The first jetty built on the site was known as King Cole's Jetty and Cole's Jetty, named after Henry Laroche Cole, the first chairman of the Perth City Council. Today six jetties exist.

As part of the Elizabeth Quay project, Barrack Street Jetty is to be reconfigured with jetties 1 and 5 extended and jetty 6 demolished.

Services
Barrack Street Jetty was served by Transperth ferry services to Mends Street until the opening of the Elizabeth Quay Jetty in January 2016. Until April 2005, Transperth services also operated to Coode Street. Rottnest Express operate services to Rottnest Island.

Various cruise operators, including Captain Cook Cruises and Golden Sun Cruises, use the jetty.

Transport links
Transperth operates one route via Barrack Street Jetty, the Blue CAT.

References

External links
Metropolitan Redevelopment Authority

Barrack Street, Perth
Jetties in Perth, Western Australia
Perth waterfront
Barrack Square, Perth